Asamoah Gyan (born 22 November 1985) is a Ghanaian professional footballer who last played as a striker for Legon Cities FC and is the former captain of the Ghana national team.

Gyan began his career in 2003 with Ghanaian Premier League club Liberty Professionals scoring ten goals in sixteen matches then spent three seasons with Serie A club Udinese via two seasons loan at Modena netting on fifteen occasions in 53 league matches and at Udinese where he scored 11 times in 39 league matches. In 2008, Gyan joined Ligue 1 club Rennes, netting fourteen times in forty-eight league matches during two seasons. In 2010, Gyan joined Premier League club Sunderland, breaking the club's transfer record and netting on ten occasions in thirty-four Premier League matches during two seasons.

In 2011, Gyan joined Al Ain of the UAE Pro-League on loan and became the league's top-goalscorer, scoring 24 times in 27 matches. In the following season, Gyan permanently joined Al Ain and once again became the league's top-goalscorer while he helped Al Ain retain the UAE Pro-League title, scoring an impressive 28 goals in 32 matches. In the 2013–14 season, Gyan scored on 44 occasions in 40 matches with Al Ain.

Gyan is the all-time leading goalscorer of the Ghana national team, with 51 goals. He represented Ghana at the 2006, 2010 and 2014 FIFA World Cups. With 6 goals, he is the top African goalscorer in the history of the World Cup. Gyan has also represented Ghana at the 2004 Summer Olympics and in seven Africa Cup of Nations in 2008, 2010, 2012, 2013, 2015, 2017 and 2019, helping them finish in third-place in 2008 and runner-up in 2010 and 2015. He launched his memoir, titled " LeGYANdry" at the Kempinski Gold Coast Hotel in Accra.

Club career

Liberty Professionals 
Born in Accra, Gyan had his early education at Seven Great Princess Academy in Dansoman completing in 1999, and his secondary education at the Accra Academy from 1999 to 2002. Gyan started his career at Ghanaian club Liberty Professionals located in Accra. In his only top flight season with the club, he played 16 league matches in the Ghana Premier League and scored 10 goals. He ended the season as the league's third top goal scorer.

Udinese 
Having signed for Udinese in 2003, he spent two years on loan at Serie B club Modena to gain match experience. Following some excellent displays during the 2006 World Cup, he attracted interest from Russian club Lokomotiv Moscow. Gyan returned to Udinese at the start of 2006, but on 17 February 2007, Udinese pulled out of a deal to sell him in the January transfer window. The striker was on the verge of signing a 3-year deal with Russian Club Lokomotiv Moscow for US$10.5 million, the fourth largest transfer fee in Russian football history. "The striker Udinese targeted to replace me did not sign for them," Gyan told BBC Sport. "I've been told I will now have to stay in Italy for the rest of the season."

On 10 August 2007, along with Fabio Quagliarella, Gyan signed an improved five-year contract extension to stay at Udinese until 30 June 2012 as a reward for his fine form in the 2007–08 pre-season. "I have decided to stay here because it is one of the top leagues in the world," Asamoah said, "There is the possibility of me playing regular football here to make me a better player. "I am comfortable with the new deal and I know I can help Udinese achieve things for the future". Gyan and Quagliarella marked their contract extensions with a brace each in Udinese's 7–0 friendly win later that evening.

On 29 July 2007 following his impressive pre-season form, including a hat-trick in a friendly against Serie B outfit Spezia on 25 July, before Udinese sealed the long-term deal. Gyan scored 8 goals in 2006–07 to help the Stadio Friuli club finish in 10th place in Serie A.

Gyan was dogged by injury during the 2007–08 season and never appeared for Udinese again after January 2008, having played only 13 Serie A matches and scored 3 times that season.

Rennes

On 11 July 2008, Gyan was signed by Ligue 1 Club Stade Rennais for 4 years on an €8 million transfer fee. Gyan played 48 times for Rennes, scoring 14 goals. By the end of his stay at Rennes, he became a well known goal scoring figure, scoring 13 league goals in the 2009–10 season. However, Gyan only played three games in Ligue 1 the following season, taking his total appearances to 53, before he departed for Sunderland.

Sunderland
On 31 August 2010, Gyan signed for Premier League club Sunderland on a four-year deal for a club record £13 million. Gyan was later given the squad number 33 shirt at Sunderland. He scored on his Sunderland debut against Wigan Athletic on 11 September after coming on as a substitute for Danny Welbeck. The match ended in a 1–1 draw with Antolín Alcaraz scoring Wigan's equaliser. He marked his first start for Sunderland by netting their only goal in their League Cup exit at the hands of West Ham United. Gyan scored twice on his first Premier League start for the club in a 2–0 win against Stoke City on 6 November. His first goal came in the 9th minute when a Nedum Onuoha shot was parried by goalkeeper Asmir Begović, with Gyan on hand to tap home the rebound and his second came in the 86th minute, to secure a 2–0 victory for the Black Cats. Three days later, he followed this up by scoring the equaliser against Tottenham at White Hart Lane in a 1–1 draw as Sunderland moved up to seventh in the table. He also scored a goal in Sunderland's 3–0 victory at Stamford Bridge against Chelsea. Gyan scored Sunderland's third goal in their 3–0 victory over Blackburn Rovers on 1 January 2011.

On 16 January 2011, he started against local rivals Newcastle United, scoring a 94th-minute equaliser, preventing Newcastle gaining their second win of the season against Sunderland. Gyan added to his impressive goalscoring tally with a goal away at Stoke City on 5 February 2011. He scored an 11th-minute goal against Tottenham on 12 February 2011. Gyan's next goal came on 23 April as Sunderland beat Wigan Athletic 4–2, a match which ended prematurely for the forward as he was substituted following a hamstring injury which is expected to see him miss the remainder of the season. Gyan did recover in time to feature in Sunderland's last game of the season at West Ham but didn't add to his tally finishing his first season in English football with 10 league goals. Gyan took the squad number 3 shirt for the 2011–12 season, the same squad number he wears for Ghana.

Al Ain
On 10 September 2011, it was confirmed on the Sunderland website that Gyan would leave on a season long loan to club Al Ain FC. Amid speculation of a fee of up to £6 million being paid for the loan period, with Gyan receiving up to four times his previous salary, Chairman Niall Quinn emphasised the financial benefits of the deal for both Sunderland and the player. The Ghanaian finished the season with Al Ain by helping them capture their tenth league success and was the top goalscorer in the season with 22 league goals.

When Martin O'Neill became manager of Sunderland on 8 December 2011, he considered the possibility of recalling Gyan from his loan spell away from the club.

Gyan signed a five-year contract with Al Ain on 6 July 2012 worth over £6m per season. He was the top goalscorer in the UAE league in the 2013 season and helped his team retain the league title. On 24 July 2014, Gyan announced on his personal website that he had signed a contract extension at Al-Ain, receiving an improved deal and tying him to the club until 2018.

Shanghai SIPG
On 7 July 2015, Gyan confirmed on his own website that he had left Al Ain and was set to join Chinese Super League club Shanghai SIPG. Shanghai SIPG then officially announced they signed Gyan from Al Ain with an undisclosed fee. It was then revealed that Gyan's weekly salary of £227,000 with his Chinese club instantly made him one of the world's best paid football players.

Kayserispor 
On 5 July 2017, he joined the Turkish club Kayserispor. On 9 August 2019, Gyan left Kayserispor.

North East United 

On 19 September 2019, he joined the Indian Super League side NorthEast United. On 26 October 2019 he scored his first goal for Northeast United FC against Odisha FC in the 84 th minute of the match as his team won the game by 2–1.
Halfway through the season, he suffered an injury that would keep him out for the rest of the season, and on 15 January 2020, he was officially released from the club as Irish striker Andy Keogh was signed as a replacement. He ended his time with Northeast United with a total of 4 goals in 8 appearances.

Legon Cities 

On 1 November 2020, Gyan returned to Ghana to join Legon Cities, in a loan deal worth more than 1 million dollars. He played his first match on 27 November 2020, coming on in the 71st minute for Raphael Ocloo in their goalless draw against Medeama, marking a 17-year return to the Ghana Premier League since leaving his boyhood club Liberty Professionals to sign for Italian club Udinese.  On 3 June 2021, Gyan started his first match for the Royals in the 2021 Ghanaian FA Cup Round of 64 match against  Uncle 'T', which ended in a 2–1 victory at Accra Sports Stadium via a brace from Richmond Antwi.

International career

Gyan made his international debut at the age of 17, three days before his 18th birthday. Gyan scored on his senior International debut for Ghana against Somalia on 19 November 2003 in the 90th minute. He came on for Nana Arhin Duah in the 77th minute in a 2006 FIFA World Cup qualifier, three days before he turned 18 years; helping Ghana to win that game, and making him the youngest ever player to score for Ghana.

He scored four times in seven matches during that successful World Cup qualifying campaign, helping Ghana to qualify for their first world cup in history. He was part of the 2004 Ghana Olympic squad, who exited in the first round, having finished in third place in Group B.

He also scored the fastest goal of the tournament after 68 seconds. The strike was also Ghana's first ever goal in the FIFA World Cup, coming in the game against the Czech Republic on 17 June at the RheinEnergieStadion in Cologne, Germany, which set the Black Stars on their way to a 2–0 victory. He missed a penalty later in the game, and received a yellow card ruling him out of the final group game for trying to take the penalty too early. In Ghana's defeat to Brazil in the round of 16, he was sent off in the 81st minute after collecting his second booking of the match (for diving).

On 24 January 2008, during the Africa Cup of Nations, Gyan and his brother Baffour decided to walk out on the Black Stars following criticism after their unconvincing 1–0 win over Namibia. The media learnt the brothers had packed their bags and were ready to leave the team hotel but were persuaded to stay by teammates. In the 2010 Africa Cup of Nations, Asamoah Gyan helped a Ghana team, ravaged by injuries to the finals. Gyan scored three out of the four Ghana goals during the tournament.

Gyan scored with a penalty in the 85th minute of Ghana's first match of the 2010 World Cup against Serbia, in a 1–0 win. He hit the goalpost in the 92nd minute before being substituted to a standing ovation just before the final whistle. In Ghana's second game, he scored a penalty in the 26th minute to level the scores and earn his team a 1–1 draw against Australia.

In the round of 16 match against the United States, he scored a goal in extra time allowing Ghana to win 2–1 and hence become the third African team in history to qualify to the tournament's quarter final, after Cameroon and Senegal. In the quarter final tie against Uruguay, following Luis Suárez's handling of the ball on the goal-line, he missed a penalty kick with no time remaining at end of extra time, hitting the crossbar and necessitating a penalty shootout to decide the game. He converted his kick in the subsequent penalty shootout, but Uruguay went on to win the shootout 4–2.

For the second time in his career, Gyan missed a crucial penalty kick in a major tournament when he missed a penalty kick in the 2012 African Cup of Nations semi-final. Ghana went on to lose 1–0. After missing that penalty kick, Gyan decided to take an "indefinite break" from international football. On 8 May 2012, he announced his return to the Black Stars team.

On 7 June 2013, he scored 2 goals in a 3–1 win over Sudan in a World Cup qualifier to make him the country's leading goalscorer, surpassing Abedi Pele's 33 goals.

On 2 June 2014, Gyan was named in Ghana's squad for the 2014 FIFA World Cup. In the team's opening match, he captained the Black Stars against the United States in a 2–1 defeat. He scored his first goal of the tournament in a 2–2 draw with Germany, equaling Roger Milla's record of five FIFA World Cup goals. In the final group match, he became the top African goalscorer in World Cup finals history by scoring the Black Stars' goal as they were defeated 2–1 by Portugal.

At the 2015 Africa Cup of Nations, Gyan missed Ghana's opening match, a 2–1 loss to Senegal, with a "mild bout" of malaria. He returned for the second match, scoring a last minute winning goal against the tournament favourite Algeria in a 1–0 win for the Black Stars.

An international exile lasting over a year was ended in October 2018 when Gyan was called up to the Ghanaian squad for a pair of 2019 Africa Cup of Nations qualification matches versus Sierra Leone.

He announced his retirement from international football on 20 May 2019, a month to the 2019 Africa Cup of Nations. However, a day later Gyan reversed his decision following a discussion with the president of Ghana, Nana Addo Dankwa Akufo-Addo. In early August of 2022 Gyan released a statement that he was training to get back to full fitness to play in the 2022 World Cup in Qatar. Gyan was not part of the 26 man squad selected to represent Ghana in the World Cup 2022 and since then has been an ample supporter of the Black Stars and has been leading fan festivals and ceremonies.

Outside football

Boxing promotion
In June 2012, Gyan turned his attention towards boxing promotion and announced he would put on his debut boxing show in Ghana. On 6 July, Asamoah Gyan stated:

In February 2021, a contract between Baby Jet Promotions and Emmanuel Tagoe who was the only boxer in the promotion's fold was terminated. The contract was for a period spanning October 2018 to November 2021.

Baby Jet Airlines
As of October 2017, Asamoah Gyan has been granted an Air Carrier Licence (ACL) by the Ghanaian Civil Aviation Authority (GCAA). According to the Ghana News Agency, the start-up is named Baby Jet Airlines. With the license in hand, the start-up is now permitted to begin with its AOC certification drive.

Tennis 
He began to play tennis in 2020 to keep him fit after a long break due to injury. Baby Jet promotions linked up with MANCWA Commodities to run the Top 16 Invitational tournament in a bid to promote the sport.

Career statistics

Club

International

Honours
Rennes

 Coupe de France runner-up: 2008–09

Al Ain
 UAE Pro League: 2011–12, 2012–13, 2014–15
 UAE President's Cup: 2013–14
 UAE Super Cup: 2012
Ghana

 Africa Cup of Nations runner-up: 2010, 2015; third place: 2008

Individual
 BBC African Footballer of the Year: 2010
 African Footballer of the Year Second Place: 2010
 CAF Team of the Year: 2010, 2013, 2014
 UAE Pro League Top Scorer: 2011–12, 2012–13, 2013–14
 AFC Champions League Top Scorer: 2014
AFC Champions League Dream Team: 2014
 AFC Foreign Player of the Year: 2014
 GCC Golden Boot: 2011–12, 2012–13, 2013–14
 UAE President's Cup Top scorer: 2013–14, 2014–15
 Africa Cup of Nations Team of the Tournament: 2010, 2013
 Ghana Men's Player of the Year Award: 2012
 Ghana Football Awards Player of the Decade: 2011–2020
 Ghana Player of the Year: 2010, 2014
 Calcio Trade Ball Order of the Star Award: 2017
Records

 Al Ain Second All-time top scorer: 128 goals
 Al Ain Second UAE Pro League top scorer: 95 goals
 Al Ain Most league goals in a season: 31 goals (2012–13 season)
 Al Ain Most AFC Champions League goals: 18 goals (shared with Omar Abdulrahman)

 Most UAE Pro League Top scorers: 3 (shared with Fahad Khamees)
 Most GCC Golden Boot (Arabian Golden Boot): 3 

 Ghana national team top goalscorer: 51 goals
 Ghana national team all-time appearance holder: 109 appearances
 Most goals for Ghana national team at World Cup: 6 goals
 Youngest goalscorer for Ghana national team: 17 years 362 days (for Ghana vrs Somalia, 2003)

 Most appearances for Ghana at African Cup of nations: 7 tournaments (shared with André Ayew)

 Most African Cup of Nations tournaments with a goal: 6 tournaments (shared with Samuel Eto'o, Kalusha Bwalya, André Ayew)
 Most Goals scored by an African at the World Cup: 6 goals
 Consecutive International tournament scoring record: 9 tournaments (shared with Cristiano Ronaldo)

See also

 List of top international men's football goalscorers by country
 List of men's footballers with 100 or more international caps
 List of men's footballers with 50 or more international goals

References

External links

 Asamoah Gyan – Goals in International Matches at RSSSF
 
 
 Premier League profile 
 

1985 births
2008 Africa Cup of Nations players
2010 Africa Cup of Nations players
2012 Africa Cup of Nations players
2013 Africa Cup of Nations players
2015 Africa Cup of Nations players
2017 Africa Cup of Nations players
2006 FIFA World Cup players
2010 FIFA World Cup players
2014 FIFA World Cup players
Al Ahli Club (Dubai) players
Al Ain FC players
Alumni of the Accra Academy
Association football forwards
Chinese Super League players
Expatriate footballers in China
Expatriate footballers in England
Expatriate footballers in France
Expatriate footballers in Italy
Expatriate footballers in Turkey
Expatriate footballers in the United Arab Emirates
FIFA Century Club
Footballers at the 2004 Summer Olympics
Ghana international footballers
Ghanaian expatriate footballers
Ghanaian expatriate sportspeople in France
Ghanaian expatriate sportspeople in Italy
Ghanaian expatriate sportspeople in England
Ghanaian expatriate sportspeople in China
Ghanaian expatriate sportspeople in Turkey
Ghanaian footballers
Kayserispor footballers
Liberty Professionals F.C. players
Ligue 1 players
Living people
Modena F.C. players
Olympic footballers of Ghana
Premier League players
Serie A players
Serie B players
Shanghai Port F.C. players
Stade Rennais F.C. players
Sunderland A.F.C. players
Süper Lig players
UAE Pro League players
Udinese Calcio players
2019 Africa Cup of Nations players
Legon Cities F.C. players